Șirineasa is a commune in Vâlcea County, Oltenia, western Wallachia, Romania.

Administration
Șirineasa is composed of 5 villages. The largest village is Ciorăști, situated in the northern part of the commune. The other villages are Aricioaia, Șirineasa, Slăvitești and Valea Alunișului.

Population
The population of Șirineasa was 2,612 in 2002. At the census that year, every inhabitant was a Romanian, and all but 4 were Romanian Orthodox.

Rivers and Lakes
Șirineasa is traversed by Luncavăț River and Firijba River. A small part near Târgu Olt is traversed by Olt River. There is also Niș (from Aluniș) brook traversing the Valley of Niș (Valea Nișului).
In the forest, there was "The Lake without bottom" (Lacul fără fund). A legend says that Nicolae Gheorghe Asproiu (19th  century), followed by police, drop the cartful with gold in this lake, in order to retrieve it after he is safe. Scientifically, the lake has a twin lake in Sibiu County, Transylvania, under the Carpathian Alps.

Tourism
Tourists can visit "The Beech" from "Cold Well". It is over 300 years old. There were the ruins of Oromului Church, build between 1751 during the rule of Ioan Grigore Voievod; the church is closed because it is under restoration.

Natives
George Țărnea, poet

Gallery

References

Communes in Vâlcea County
Localities in Oltenia